The 1980 President's Cup Football Tournament was the tenth competition of Korea Cup. It was held from 23 August to 2 September 1980, and was won by South Korea for the sixth time, who defeated Indonesia in the final.

Group stage

Final

See also
Korea Cup
South Korea national football team results

External links
President's Cup 1980 (South Korea) at RSSSF

1980